Karimabad-e Abnil (also Romanized as Karīmābād-e Ābnīl; also known as Karīmābād and Karīmābād-e Nīl) is a village in Kavirat Rural District, Chatrud District, Kerman County, Kerman Province, Iran. At the 2006 census, its population was 311, in 74 families.

References 

Populated places in Kerman County